Bosco may refer to:

People

Given name Bosco
 Bosco (drag queen) (born 1993), Drag Queen
 Bosco Lin Chi-nan (born 1943), Taiwanese bishop
 Bosco Frontán (born 1984), Uruguayan soccer player
 Bosco Hogan (born 1949), Irish actor
 Bosco Lowe (born 1943), American car race driver
 Bosco Mann (born 1974), American record producer
 Bosco McDermott (born 1936), Irish former sportsperson
 Bosco Ntaganda (born 1973), Congolese warlord
 Bosco Pérez-Pla (born 1987), Spanish field hockey player
 Bosco Puthur (born 1946), Syro-Malabar Catholic bishop
 Bosco Saraiva (born 1959), Brazilian politician
 Bosco da Silva (born 1937), Hong Kong field hockey player
 Bosco Sodi (born 1970), Mexican artist
 Bosco Tjan (1966-2016), Chinese-American psychologist and neuroscientist
 Bosco Wong (born 1980), Hong Kong actor

Middle name Bosco
 Jean Bosco Mwenda (1930–1990), Congolese guitarist
 João Bosco de Freitas Chaves (born 1964), Brazilian footballer
 John Bosco Manat Chuabsamai (1935-2011), Thai priest
 Juan Bosco Maino Canales (disappeared 1976), Chilean political activist

Surname Bosco
 Douglas H. Bosco (born 1946), American politician
 Giacinto Bosco (1905–1997), Italian jurist, academic and politician
  Giovanni Bartolomeo Bosco (1793–1863), Italian magician
 Henri Bosco (1888–1976), French writer
 João Bosco (born 1946), Brazilian musician
 John Bosco (1815–1888), aka Don Bosco, Italian priest and founder of the Salesian Society
 Philip Bosco (1930–2018), American actor
 Robbie Bosco, American football quarterback for Brigham Young University
 Sacro Bosco (c. 1195-c. 1256), English monk and astronomer
 Yuri Bosco (1930–2019), Russian sculptor

Places

Italy
Bosco (Albanella), a civil parish of the municipality of Albanella (SA), Campania
Bosco (Rovito), a civil parish of the municipality of Rovito (CS), Calabria
Bosco (San Giovanni a Piro), a civil parish of the municipality of San Giovanni a Piro (SA), Campania
Bosco Chiesanuova, a municipality of the Province of Verona, Veneto
Bosco Marengo, a municipality of the Province of Alessandria, Piedmont
Boscoreale, a municipality of the Province of Naples, Campania
Boscotrecase, a municipality of the Province of Naples, Campania
Castelnuovo Don Bosco, a municipality of the Province of Asti, Piedmont
San Giorgio in Bosco, a municipality of the Province of Padua, Veneto
Sommariva del Bosco, a municipality of the Province of Cuneo, Piedmont

Switzerland
Bosco/Gurin, a municipality of the Canton Ticino

United States
Bosco, Kentucky
Bosco, Louisiana

Arts, entertainment, and media

Artists and performers
Bosco (drag queen), performing name of Christopher Constantino, a drag performer from Seattle and contestant on season 14 of RuPaul's Drag Race

Fictional characters
 Sgt. Bosco "B.A." Baracus, a The A-Team character
 Maurice 'Bosco' Boscorelli, a Third Watch character
 Agent Sam Bosco, a The Mentalist character
 Sergeant Bosco, a Bob's Burgers character

Television 
 Bosco (TV series), a 1970s-1980s Irish programme
 Bosco Adventure, an anime television series

Other uses
 Bosco (grape)
 Bosco Chocolate Syrup
 Bosco the dog, a dog elected honorary mayor of Sunol, California
 BOSCO-Uganda, a non-profit internet connectivity organization
 , a Russian sportswear brand

See also
Bosko (disambiguation)
 Don Bosco School (disambiguation)